Ruth Osburn (April 24, 1912 – January 8, 1994) was an American athlete who competed mainly in the discus. She was born in Shelbyville, Missouri, United States.

She competed for the United States in the 1932 Summer Olympics held in Los Angeles, where she won the Silver medal for discus throw behind teammate Lillian Copeland. She was born in Shelbyville, Missouri.

References

External links
 

1912 births
1994 deaths
Sportspeople from Missouri
People from Shelbyville, Missouri
American female discus throwers
Olympic silver medalists for the United States in track and field
Athletes (track and field) at the 1932 Summer Olympics
Medalists at the 1932 Summer Olympics
20th-century American women